is a 1990 Japanese film directed by Junji Sakamoto. It stars Takeshi Yamato, Bunta Sugawara and Karen Kirishima.

Plot
The plot centers around a young ex-prisoner who takes up boxing (tekken is Japanese for "clenched fist").

Awards
Bunta Sugawara won a Hochi Film Award for Best Actor for his performance.

Other uses
This film has no relation to the Tekken video game series or the video game based 2010 film counterpart, even using the same name. Another version was released in 2009.

External links 
 

1990 films
Films directed by Junji Sakamoto
1990s Japanese-language films
Films scored by Shigeru Umebayashi
1990s Japanese films